Kvitheim is a small, rural village in Voss municipality, Norway. Kvitheim is located north of the municipal centre, Vossevangen. The village of Borstrondi lies just across the lake Melsvatnet to the west. Norwegian County Road 309 runs through the village, and connects to the European route E16 in Borstrondi.

References

Villages in Vestland
Voss